Agnes Slott-Møller, née Rambusch (10 June 1862, in Nyboder – 11 June 1937, in Løgismose, Assens Municipality), was a Danish Symbolist painter; influenced by the Pre-Raphaelites. She is known for works inspired by Danish history and folklore. Her husband was the painter Harald Slott-Møller.

Biography 
Her father, Jacob Heinrich Victor Rambusch (1825–1886), was a navy officer who was eventually  promoted to Commander. In 1878, she began taking lessons at the "". She graduated in 1885 and took additional lessons from P.S. Krøyer, followed by more with Harald Slott-Møller, whom she married in 1888 and embarked with on a tour of Italy.

In 1891, she and her husband helped their friend, Johan Rohde, establish the artists' association known as "Den Frie Udstilling". She had her first daughter in 1893. A second daughter, born in 1901, died in infancy. In 1894, she won a competition to provide decorative works at the Copenhagen City hall. Despite her fervent Danish nationalism, this would be her only official commission.

In 1904, following some disagreements at Den Frie Udstilling, she resumed her showings at the Charlottenborg Spring Exhibition. Two years later, she was awarded the Eckersberg Medal. In 1907, a feud with the Funen Painters, known as the "" (Peasant painter conflict) led to her and Harald's increasing isolation from the contemporary art scene.

She also wrote articles and gave lectures on Danish medieval history and nationalistic subjects. In 1917, she published Nationale Værdier (National Values) and, in 1923, Folkevise Billeder (Folk Images). In 1932, she was awarded the Ingenio et arti medal.

Selected paintings

References

Further reading 
 Iben Overgaard: Agnes Slott-Møller : Skønhed er til evig glæde, Skovgaard Museum, 2008 
 Lise Svanholm (ed.): Agnes og Marie : breve mellem Agnes Slott-Møller og Marie Krøyer 1885-1937, Gyldendal, 1991 
 Bodil Busk Laursen (ed.): Agnes og Harald Slott-Møller – mellem kunst og idealer, Kunstforeningen, 1988

External links

 ArtNet: More works by Slott-Møller.
 "Agnes Slott-Møller - beauty is eternal joy" @ Kunstonline.dk

1862 births
1937 deaths
Danish women painters
Recipients of the Eckersberg Medal
19th-century Danish painters
20th-century Danish painters
19th-century Danish women artists
20th-century Danish women artists
Burials at Holmen Cemetery